Youth March for Integrated Schools was the second of two Youth Marches that rallied in Washington, D.C. The second march occurred on April 18, 1959, at the National Sylvan Theater and was attended by an estimated 26,000 individuals.  The march was a follow-up to the first Youth March to demonstrate support for ongoing efforts to end racially segregated schools in the United States.  Speeches were delivered by Martin Luther King Jr., A. Philip Randolph, Roy Wilkins, and Charles S. Zimmerman. Other civil rights leaders that spoke at this event included Daisy Bates, Harry Belafonte and Jackie Robinson. At this event, the speech that Martin Luther King Jr. delivered was very impactful. King went on to state, "What this march demonstrates to me, above all else, is that you young people, through your own experience, have somehow discovered the central fact of American life that the extension of democracy for all Americans depends upon complete integration of Negro Americans." This demonstrates the overall reason why this march was so important. 

To rally citizens together for this march, there were flyers posted titled, "Why We March", in an attempt to motivate the youth to participate. This flyer stated, "We march to protest the century-long mistreatment of Negor citizens. They have waited long enough. We march to demand real democracy--now!" Information regarding this march was also published in Martin Luther King's book titled, " The Papers of Martin Luther King". In this novel, King describes how important it was that the youth were the ones participating and leading this march in order to make a difference. This march would show how much it meant to the African American youth to fight for integrated schools.

See also
 List of protest marches on Washington, D.C.

References

1959 in Washington, D.C.
Civil rights movement
 Civil rights protests in the United States
 Martin Luther King Jr.
 Protest marches in Washington, D.C.
1959 protests